The Valsorey Glacier is a 3.5 km long glacier (2005) situated in the Pennine Alps in the canton of Valais in Switzerland. In 1973 it had an area of 2.37 km².

See also
List of glaciers in Switzerland
Swiss Alps

External links
Swiss glacier monitoring network

Glaciers of the Alps
Glaciers of Valais